Kenrick's starling (Poeoptera kenricki) is a species of starling in the family Sturnidae. It is found in Kenya and Tanzania.

References

External links
Image at ADW

Kenrick's starling
Birds of East Africa
Kenrick's starling
Taxonomy articles created by Polbot